The Vuelta a Navarra is a road cycling stage race held annually since 1941 in the Autonomous community of Navarra, Spain. It was part of the UCI Europe Tour in category 2.2 from 2005 to 2008, and has been reserved for amateurs since 2009.

Winners

References

UCI Europe Tour races
Cycle races in Spain
Recurring sporting events established in 1941
1941 establishments in Spain